The Koranga River is a river of the northeast of New Zealand's North Island. It lies to the east of Te Urewera National Park, to the southwest of the settlement of Matawai, and flows northwest to reach its outflow into the Waioeka River.

See also
List of rivers of New Zealand

References

Rivers of the Bay of Plenty Region
Rivers of the Gisborne District
Rivers of New Zealand